Kim Il-sung Military University (also known as Kim Il-sung Military Academy) is a university located in Mangyongdae-guyok, Pyongyang, capital of North Korea. Founded in 1948 and named after Kim Il-sung, founder of North korea, the school is a post-secondary educational institution for officers in the Korean People's Army. It is the most prominent military academy in North Korea.

The current president of the university is not known.

Notable alumni

 Kim Jong-un
 Kim Yo-jong
 Kim Yong-chun
 Kim Jong-gak
 Chu Sang-song
 Ri Yong-ho
 Pak Jae-gyong
 Kim Pyong-il

References

Military academies
Universities in North Korea
Education in Pyongyang
Buildings and structures in Pyongyang
Educational institutions established in 1948
1948 establishments in Korea
Military education and training in North Korea